The EuroSwift SC92 is an open-wheel formula race car, designed, developed and built to Formula Ford 1600 specifications, in 1992.

References 

Open wheel racing cars
Formula Ford cars